The Greatest X (pronounced as "The Greatest Unknown") is the tenth studio album by American hip hop recording artist Reks. It was released on September 9, 2016, by Brick Records. The album features guest appearances from artists such as Termanology, Jared Evan, Edo G, R.A. the Rugged Man, Planet Asia and Guilty Simpson, among others. The album's production was handled by several producers, including Large Professor, The Alchemist, Nottz, Buckwild, Black Milk, Apollo Brown, Statik Selektah and The Audible Doctor.

Track listing

References

2016 albums
Reks albums
Albums produced by the Alchemist (musician)
Albums produced by Apollo Brown
Albums produced by Black Milk
Albums produced by Buckwild
Albums produced by Evidence (musician)
Albums produced by J57
Albums produced by Large Professor
Albums produced by MoSS
Albums produced by Nottz
Albums produced by Statik Selektah